Federation Day is a day in the Welsh school week when all the primary and secondary children come together in one unit. It is a solution for rural small schools in Wales.

References

External links
Guidance on the Federation process of maintained schools
 Cardiff schools consider 'federation' approach
 Estyn

Education in Wales